Urdu Academy, Andhra Pradesh is an educational institution developing the Urdu language and preserving the Urdu tradition and culture in Andhra Pradesh. It was established in the year 1982.

The academy is a subsidiary of the Ministry of Minorities affairs, and is under the direct control of the ministry as well.

History
The former Andhra Pradesh government established this academy. It organized many cultural and educational programs. The academy's headquarters were in Vijayawada City.

In January 2018, the designation of its President and Vice President were changed to chairman and Vice- Chairman. Its budget is increasing from 29.9 million rupees to 58.6 million.

Activities
The functions of the Academy are specified in the Memorandum of Association of the Constitution of Urdu Academy.

 Publication, translation and printing of publications.
 Research work, festivals, seminars, symposiums, mushairas and state level events.
 Honouring literary figures, awarding prizes, awards etc.,

Publications
 Qaumi Zaban (Urdu bi-monthly magazine)

References

Organisations based in Andhra Pradesh
Linguistic research institutes in India
Urdu Academies in India
1982 establishments in Andhra Pradesh
Educational institutions established in 1982